Georges Jean (16 September 1920 – 19 December 2011) was a French poet and essayist specializing in the fields of linguistics, semiology and children's literature.

Career 
Georges Jean was born in Besançon, after studying philosophy, he entered the École normale supérieure de Saint-Cloud. He has devoted himself to teaching linguistics, poetry and semiology in the city Le Mans and the University of Maine where he was professor of linguistics and semiology from 1967 to 1981. He was a teacher at the École Nationale Supérieure des Sciences de l'Information et des Bibliothèques, and published more than 70 books including several collections of poems, essays and theories on poetry and pedagogy.

His book  won the ‘Mention’ Budding Critic Award from Bologna Children's Book Fair in 1983. Another book  (English edition – Writing: The Story of Alphabets and Scripts) was one of the bestsellers in France, and has been translated into 21 languages.

Selected bibliography 
 Le plaisir des mots : Dictionnaire poétique illustré, collection « Découverte Cadet », série Hors série. Éditions Gallimard, 1982
 Dictionnaire des poètes et de la poésie, Éditions Gallimard, 1983
 Bachelard, l’enfance et la pédagogie, Éditions du Scarabée, 1983
 L’écriture, mémoire des hommes, collection « Découvertes Gallimard » (nº 24), série Archéologie. Éditions Gallimard, 1987, new edition in 2007 (translated into 21 languages with a total of 24 international editions)
 US edition – Writing: The Story of Alphabets and Scripts, "Abrams Discoveries" series. Harry N. Abrams, 1992
 UK edition – Writing: The Story of Alphabets and Scripts, ‘New Horizons’ series. Thames & Hudson, 1992
 Langage de signes : L’écriture et son double, collection « Découvertes Gallimard » (nº 67), série Archéologie. Éditions Gallimard, 1989
 U.S. edition – Signs, Symbols, and Ciphers, "Abrams Discoveries" series. Harry N. Abrams, 1998
 UK edition – Signs, Symbols and Ciphers: Decoding the Message, ‘New Horizons’ series. Thames & Hudson, 1999
 Voyages en Utopie, collection « Découvertes Gallimard » (nº 200), série Littératures. Éditions Gallimard, 1994

References 

1920 births
2011 deaths
Linguists from France
French semioticians
20th-century French poets
21st-century French poets
French children's writers
ENS Fontenay-Saint-Cloud-Lyon alumni